The Ware Paper Mill is a historic mill building at 2276 Washington Street in Newton, Massachusetts.  Built in 1790, it is a remnant of the first paper mill to be built on the banks of the Charles River.  The -story stone building was built by John Ware, a veteran of the American Revolutionary War, and was in use for paper production until 1938.  A brick addition was added to the rear of the building in the 19th century; its interior was effectively stripped in the 1973.

The building was listed on the National Register of Historic Places in 1978.

See also
 National Register of Historic Places listings in Newton, Massachusetts

References

National Register of Historic Places in Newton, Massachusetts
Industrial buildings and structures on the National Register of Historic Places in Massachusetts
Buildings and structures in Newton, Massachusetts